These are tables of congressional delegations from Michigan to the United States House of Representatives and the United States Senate.

The current dean of the Michigan congressional delegation is Senator Debbie Stabenow (D), having served in Congress since 1997.

U.S. House of Representatives

Current members 
List of members of the United States House delegation from Michigan, their terms in office, district boundaries, and the district political ratings according to the CPVI. The delegation has a total of 13 members, with 7 Democrats and 6 Republicans.

Delegates from Michigan Territory

Members of the House from Michigan

1837–1843

1843–1853

1853–1863

1863–1873

1873–1883

1883–1893

1893–1915

1915–1933

1933–1965

1965–1993

1993–2013

2013–2023

2023–present

United States Senate

}}

Senate delegation timeline (1835–present)

Tables showing membership in the Michigan federal Senate delegation throughout history of statehood in the United States.

Key

See also

List of United States congressional districts
Michigan's congressional districts
Political party strength in Michigan

Notes

References 

 
 
Michigan
Politics of Michigan
Congressional delegations